Jeanne Ellegaard (born July 2, 1987) is a Danish curler.

Career
Ellegaard was a member of the Danish team that won a silver medal at the 2005 European Youth Olympic Festival. She played second for Madeleine Dupont.

At the 2006 World Junior Curling Championships, Ellegaard was the alternate player for Nielsen's bronze medal-winning team. The following year, she won another bronze medal, this time throwing third rocks for Madeleine Dupont at the 2007 World Junior Curling Championships. Later that year, she won a bronze medal at the 2007 European Curling Championships as the alternate for the Nielsen team.

Dupont and Ellegaard played in the 2008 World Junior Curling Championships as well, finishing 5th. After juniors, Ellegaard would move to the Nielsen rink as its second thrower. She finished 5th at the 2010 European Curling Championships and would represent the home Denmark rink at the 2011 Capital One World Women's Curling Championship.

External links

Living people
Danish female curlers
1987 births
Curlers at the 2014 Winter Olympics
Olympic curlers of Denmark
21st-century Danish women